The 1915 Montana football team represented the University of Montana in the 1915 college football season. They were led by first-year head coach Jerry Nissen, played their home games at Dornblaser Field, and finished the season with a record of 2–2–2.

Schedule

 One game was played on Thursday (against Syracuse on Thanksgiving)

References

Montana
Montana Grizzlies football seasons
Montana football